Klio was a  cargo ship that was built in 1924 by AG Weser, Bremen, Germany for Neptun Line. In 1945, she was seized by the Allies and passed to the Ministry of War Transport (MoWT), renamed Empire Conclyde. In 1946, she was passed to the Soviet Union and renamed Shota Rustavelli.

Description
The ship was built in 1924 by AG Weser, Bremen.

She had a GRT of 1,403 and a NRT of 635.

The engine was built by AG Weser.

History

Klio
Klio was built for «Dampfschiffahrts Gesellschaft "Neptun"» AG (Neptun Line), Bremen. Her port of registry was Bremen. The Code Letters QLWR and German Official Number 2467 were allocated.

On 18 September 1925, the steamer  пароход was transferred under the management of the combined German-Dutch company «Deutsch-Niederlandische Finanzabkommen GmbH», Berlin. However, she returned to the company «Dampfschifffahrts Gesellschaft "Neptun"», Bremen, on 7 March 1930.

In 1934, the ship's Code Letters were changed to DONP.

At the beginning of World War II the ship Klio based at the Spanish ports of Bilbao and Muzel. The steamer delivered goods to the southern ports of France from 18 September 1940.

Empire Conclyde
In May 1945, Klio was seized by the Allies at Rendsburg. She was passed to the MoWT and renamed Empire Conclyde. She was placed under the management of William Robertson & Co Ltd, Glasgow. Her port of registry was changed to London and the Code Letters GSPZ, and United Kingdom Official Number BR № 180740.

Шота Руставели
In March 1946, as per repatriation, Empire Conclyde was transferred to the Soviet Union, renamed Shota Rustavelli signed on to Sakhalin Shipping Company. The ship sailed from London on 19 March 1946. Destination port was Odessa, for repair. The ship visited Gibraltar during 27–29 March 1946. She passed Istanbul, Bosphorus Strait, on 8 April 1946.

After repair Шота Руставели sailed from Odessa to Far East and passed Istanbul, Bosphorus Strait, on 2 August and passed Suez Canal during 8–11 August 1946. The ship visited:
 Djibouti on 18 and 19 August,
 Aden during 19–24 August,
 Colombo during 5–11 September,
 Hong Kong during 7–10 October 1946.

After regular repair in Vladivostok the ship arrived in own home port Kholmsk, Sakhalin Shipping Company. The ship Шота Руставели Call sign was UKID.

The cargo ship Shota Rustavelli was decommissioned and withdrawn from the ship's list of the Sakhalin Shipping Company in the end of 1963.

Other ships Шота Руставели.
New Soviet passenger sip Shota Rustaveli was built for the Soviet Union in 1968.

Pay attention please that cargo ship Шота Руставели (1925) was named in English Shota Rustavelli (double L), and passenger ship Шота Руставели (1968) had English name Shota Rustaveli (single L).

Photos
   Шота Руставели at anchor.
   Шота Руставели alongside the berth.

References

1924 ships
Steamships of Germany
Merchant ships of Germany
World War II merchant ships of Germany
Ministry of War Transport ships
Empire ships
Steamships of the United Kingdom
Merchant ships of the United Kingdom
Steamships of the Soviet Union
Merchant ships of the Soviet Union
Germany–Soviet Union relations
Ships built in Bremen (state)